Bowhill may refer to:
People
Frederick Bowhill, (1880 – 1960), RAF Air Chief Marshal
Places
Bowhill, Fife, near Kirkcaldy, Scotland
Bowhill, Scottish Borders, near Selkirk, Scotland
Bowhill House, a historic house near Bowhill at Selkirk in the Scottish Borders
Bowhill, South Australia.